Wilfred Podestá MBE (6 March 1912 – 30 June 1973) was a Maltese water polo player. He competed in the men's tournament at the 1936 Summer Olympics.

References

1912 births
1973 deaths
Maltese male water polo players
Olympic water polo players of Malta
Water polo players at the 1936 Summer Olympics
Place of birth missing